The 1987 Italian general election was held in Italy on 14–15 June 1987. This election was the first Italian election in which the distance between the Christian Democrats and the Communists grew significantly instead of decreasing. Two parties that had not previously been in parliament won representation: the Greens with thirteen seats, and the Northern League with two.

Electoral system
The pure party-list proportional representation had traditionally become the electoral system for the Chamber of Deputies. Italian provinces were united in 32 constituencies, each electing a group of candidates. At constituency level, seats were divided between open lists using the largest remainder method with Imperiali quota. Remaining votes and seats were transferred at national level, where they was divided using the Hare quota, and automatically distributed to best losers into the local lists.

For the Senate, 237 single-seat constituencies were established, even if the assembly had risen to 315 members. The candidates needed a landslide victory of two thirds of votes to be elected, a goal which could be reached only by the German minorities in South Tirol. All remained votes and seats were grouped in party lists and regional constituencies, where a D'Hondt method was used: inside the lists, candidates with the best percentages were elected.

Historical background
In the 1980s, for the first time since 1945, two governments were led by non-Christian Democrat Premiers: the republican Giovanni Spadolini and the socialist Bettino Craxi; the Christian Democracy remained however the main force supporting the government.

With the end of the Years of Lead, the Italian Communist Party gradually increased their votes under the leadership of Enrico Berlinguer. The Socialist party (PSI), led by Craxi, became more and more critical of the communists and of the Soviet Union; Craxi himself pushed in favour of US president Ronald Reagan's positioning of Pershing II missiles in Italy, a move the communists hotly contested.

In June 1984 Berlinguer, the charismatic Communist leader, suddenly left the stage during a speech at a public meeting in Padua: he had suffered a brain haemorrhage, and died three days later. More than a million citizens attended his funeral, one of the biggest in Italy's history. Alessandro Natta was appointed as new party's secretary. The public emotion caused by Berlinguer's death resulted in an extraordinary strength for the Communist Party in the 1984 European election: for the first time in Western Europe since the French election of 1956, and for the first time ever in Italian history, a Communist party received a plurality by a democratic vote.

In 1984, the Craxi government revised the 1927 Lateran Pacts with the Vatican, which concluded the role of Catholicism as Italy's state religion.

During this period, Italy became the fifth-largest industrial nation and gained entry into the G7.

Parties and leaders

Results

Chamber of Deputies

Results by constituency

Senate of the Republic

Results by constituency

Maps

References

1987
General election
June 1987 events in Europe